List of U-boat flotillas contains lists of the German U-boat flotillas in the two World Wars. The bases shown here are the ones at which the flotillas spent most of their career.  During World War II, submarine flotillas were often tactically deployed, in contrast to the surface flotillas of the Kriegsmarine which were mainly administrative.

World War I 
This list contains the German U-boats flotillas during the First World War.

World War II 
This list contains the German U-boats flotillas during the Second World War.  After 1941, the U-boat flotillas were in turn organized into U-boat regions.

External links
 Uboat.net: U-boat flotillas webpage

 01
.Uboat flotillas
.Uboat flotillas
Lists of military units and formations of Germany
Lists of military units and formations of World War I
U-boat flotillas
UBoa
UBoa
Naval history of Germany
U-boat flotillas